Laura Elizabeth Tobin FRMS (born 10 October 1981) is an English broadcast meteorologist. She worked for the BBC before moving to the ITV Breakfast programme Daybreak in 2012. Daybreak was later replaced by Good Morning Britain in early 2014. Tobin currently presents the weather bulletins for the programme.

Early life and education
Tobin was born and raised in Northampton. She attended Duston Upper School, gaining A-Levels in Mathematics, Physics and Art, and then obtained a degree in Physics and Meteorology at the University of Reading. Tobin also completed a  World Meteorological Organization course on climate.

Career
On graduation in 2003, she joined the Met Office. On completing her training, she was assigned in October 2004 to the Cardiff Weather Centre, where she gained experience of broadcasting on BBC Radio Wales. In 2005, Tobin moved to RAF Brize Norton, providing aeronautical meteorology reports and briefings to Royal Air Force transport crews and to the media of BFBS, the British Forces Broadcasting Service.

Tobin joined the team of BBC Weather Centre forecasters at the end of 2007, eventually regularly appearing on the BBC News channel, BBC World News, BBC Radio 5 Live, and the on-demand interactive services of BBC Red Button found on digital terrestrial and digital satellite TV. She also regularly presented the weather for the BBC News at One on the BBC.

On 3 September 2012 she joined the newly relaunched breakfast programme Daybreak as the weather presenter. On 18 July 2013, Tobin appeared on BBC Radio 1's Innuendo Bingo. In April 2014, Daybreak was replaced by Good Morning Britain. Tobin continues to front the weather updates on the programme. Her first show was on 28 April 2014. In November 2015, Tobin was a contestant on a celebrity episode of The Chase. In 2016, she took part in celebrity driving show Drive, hosted by Vernon Kay.

In February 2017, Tobin broke the Guinness World Record for filling and folding 11 pancakes in 60 seconds.

In 2018, Tobin joined 26 other celebrities and performed an original Christmas song called Rock With Rudolph, written and produced by Grahame and Jack Corbyn. The song was recorded in aid of Great Ormond Street Hospital and was released digitally on independent record label Saga Entertainment on 30 November 2018 under the artist name The Celebs. The music video debuted exclusively with The Sun on 29 November 2018 and had its first TV showing on Good Morning Britain on 30 November 2018. During an interview with Aled Jones and Russell Watson about their new album, Aled jested "No one listens to the weather," Tobin responded by singing a line from the song followed by "Stick that, Aled!" The song peaked at number two on the iTunes pop chart. 

In 2020, amid the COVID-19 crisis Tobin rejoined The Celebs and sang the opening lyrics on the charity Christmas song called Merry Christmas Everyone, which was released digitally on 11 December 2020 through independent label Saga Entertainment. She performed alongside 31 other celebrities on the song - including: Sam Bailey, Anna Nightingale, Richard Arnold and Frank Bruno to raise money for Alzheimer’s Society and Action for Children charities. The music video debuted exclusively on Good Morning Britain the day before release. The song peaked at number two on the iTunes pop chart.

On 28 January 2021, Tobin reported for ITV’s Tonight programme.

Tobin believes in educating climate deniers about the science of climate change rather than ignoring or confronting them.  "Unlike many who face abuse and complaints on Twitter, Tobin makes a point of replying to climate deniers and even replies to their tweets live on air, answering their questions."

Awards
In 2015, she was nominated for a TRIC Award in the "Weather Presenter" category, but lost out to Carol Kirkwood. She was nominated for the same award in 2017.

In 2021, Tobin was awarded the Fellowship of the Royal Meteorological Society "In recognition of substantial contributions to meteorology in professional work".

Personal life
Tobin married Dean Brown on 13 August 2010,  and gave birth to their first child, a  daughter called Charlotte in July 2017.

Tobin has a twin brother called Mark.

She was the first member of the public to ride The Smiler roller coaster at Alton Towers.

Filmography
Television

Film

References

External links

Laura Tobin at Biogs.com

1981 births
Living people
Alumni of the University of Reading
English mathematicians
English meteorologists
English physicists
ITV Breakfast presenters and reporters
People from Northampton